.17 Winchester Super Magnum, is a rimfire rifle cartridge developed by the ammunition company Winchester in 2012. It descended from the .27 caliber nail-gun blank by necking down the blank case to take a .17 caliber (4.5 mm) bullet. Initial loadings were with a 20-grain bullet, delivering muzzle velocities around 3,000 ft/s .

Development
Winchester, in conjunction with Savage, introduced this cartridge at the 2013 SHOT Show.  

The brass case for this round is roughly 50% thicker than the 17 HMR, and the max average internal pressure is 33,000 psi, compared to the 17 HMR's 26,000 psi.

Factory ammunition
Factory ammunition is available from Winchester, Federal, American Eagle, and more recently, Hornady.

Hornady 17 Win Super Mag and Federal Ammunition American Eagle 17 Win. Super Magnum cartridges are currently only available with 20-grain polymer-tipped projectiles rated at 3,000 FPS at the muzzle.

Several options from Winchester are available, including Varmint HV 17 Winchester Super Magnum with a 20-grain polymer-tipped projectile rated at 3,000 FPS, Varmint HE 17 Winchester Super Magnum with a 25-grain polymer-tipped projectile rated at 2,600 fps, and Varmint-X 17 Winchester Super Magnum which is available with a lead-free 15-grain polymer tipped projectile, rated at 3,300 FPS.

Firearms
Currently, rifles firing the 17 WSM are the Savage B-Mag bolt action, heavy barrel B-mag target edition. Ruger Model 77/17, Winchester 1885 Low Wall single shot, and the semi-automatic Franklin Armory F-17. The F-17 is the first gas-piston operated rimfire firearm designed to handle the higher pressures of this cartridge. Also recently Jard Inc. joined this list with their J71 17 WSM AR 15 rifle.

See also
 4 mm caliber
 Table of handgun and rifle cartridges

References

External links 
 Super .17 WSM: Savage B-Mag Review

Pistol and rifle cartridges
Rimfire cartridges
Winchester Magnum rifle cartridges